The gold dust day gecko (Phelsuma laticauda) is a diurnal species of gecko. It lives in northern Madagascar, Tanzania (Dar Es Salaam) and on the island of Comoros; it has also been introduced to Hawaii and other Pacific islands. It's typically seen in houses and various trees. The gold dust day gecko feeds on insects and nectar. It is commonly known as the mascot of GEICO Insurance, and also as the main character of the video game series Gex.

One subspecies is recognized (in addition to the nominate one): Phelsuma laticauda angularis.

Description
This lizard can reach a total length of 3.9-5.1″ (10-13cm). The body colour is a bright green or yellowish green or rarely blue. Typical for this day gecko are the red speckles on the neck and the upper back. There are three rust-coloured transverse bars on the snout and head; the upper part of the skin around the eye is blue. On the lower back there are three tapering red bars. The tail is slightly flattened. The under side is off-white. Juveniles lack the red colourations and the tail and limbs appear off-white.

Diet

These day geckos feed on various insects and other invertebrates, and are also capable of eating other smaller lizards. They also eat soft, sweet fruit and pollen and nectar from flowers, often congregating in groups of many individuals to feed off of one plant.

Behavior

The males of this species are rather aggressive. They do not accept other males in their territory. In captivity, where the females cannot escape, the males may also seriously wound a female.

Reproduction
The females lay up to 10 eggs. At a temperature of 28 °C, the young will hatch after approximately 40–45 days. The juveniles measure 55–60 mm. They should be kept separately since the juveniles can be quite quarrelsome. Sexual maturity is reached after 10–12 months.

Captivity
This gecko is occasionally kept as a pet; with good care, this species may live up to 15 years.

References

Phelsuma
Reptiles of the Comoros
Reptiles of Madagascar
Taxa named by Oskar Boettger
Reptiles described in 1880